Epidesma crameri is a moth of the subfamily Arctiinae. It was described by Travassos in 1938. It is found in Brazil.

References

 Natural History Museum Lepidoptera generic names catalog

Epidesma
Moths described in 1938